Giampiero Dotti (born 9 January 1951) is an Italian yacht racer who competed in the 1972 Summer Olympics.

References

1951 births
Living people
Italian male sailors (sport)
Olympic sailors of Italy
Sailors at the 1972 Summer Olympics – Tempest